Blastobasis retectella is a moth in the  family Blastobasidae. It is found in the United States, including Texas, Florida and Maine.

References

Moths described in 1873
Blastobasis